Nasrullah Khan may refer to:

Nasrullah Khan (Bukhara) (died 1860), Emir of Bukhara, 1826–1860
Mirza Nasrullah Khan (1840–1907), Iranian government minister
Nasrullah Khan (Afghanistan) (1875–1920), Emir of Afghanistan
Nawabzada Nasrullah Khan (1918–2003), Pakistani politician
Nasrullah Khan Khattak (1928–2009), Pakistani politician
Nasrullah Khan (squash player), Pakistani squash player and coach to Jonah Barrington
Nasrullah Khan (footballer) (born 1985), Pakistani footballer